Philip L. Roe is a Professor of Aerospace Engineering at the University of Michigan in Ann Arbor. He is known for his work in the field of Computational Fluid Dynamics and Magnetohydrodynamics. Roe made fundamental contributions to the development of high-resolution schemes for hyperbolic conservation laws. He has developed approximate Riemann solver called Roe solver for compressible flows with shocks.

Career
After completing his education at Cambridge University, UK, Roe worked for the Royal Aircraft Establishment from 1962 to 1984. Initially he worked in the field of missile aerodynamics and later shifted to CFD and devised the Roe solver for numerical computation of compressible flows with shocks. He published this work in the seminal paper titled "Approximate Riemann solvers, parameter vectors, and difference schemes" which appeared in the Journal of Computational Physics in 1981. In 1984, Phil Roe left Royal Aircraft Establishment and joined Cranfield University. Subsequently, in 1990 he moved to the University of Michigan where he is a Professor of Aerospace Engineering.

References

Computational fluid dynamicists
University of Michigan faculty
Fellows of the American Institute of Aeronautics and Astronautics
Living people
Year of birth missing (living people)